Thomas John Gumbleton (born January 26, 1930) is an American social activist and retired prelate of the Catholic Church. Gumbleton served as an auxiliary bishop of the Archdiocese of Detroit from 1968 to 2006. According to Gumbleton, the Vatican forced him to resign as auxiliary bishop when he publicly supported passage of a state legislative bill in another diocese without the approval of that diocese's bishop.

Biography

Early life
Born in Detroit, Michigan on January 26, 1930, Thomas Gumbleton attended Sacred Heart Seminary High School in that city. He then studied at St. John's Provincial Seminary in Plymouth, Michigan, and also the Pontifical Lateran University in Rome. He earned a Bachelor of Arts in 1952, a Master of Divinity in 1956, and a Doctor of Canon Law in 1964.

On June 2, 1956, Gumbleton was ordained to the priesthood in Rome by Cardinal Edward Mooney for the Archdiocese of Detroit. In 1968, Gumbleton was appointed as vicar general for the Archdiocese.

Auxiliary Bishop of Detroit 
On March 4, 1968, Pope Paul VI appointed Gumbleton as an auxiliary bishop of the Archdiocese of Detroit and titular bishop of Ululi. He was consecrated on May 1, 1968, by Archbishop John Dearden. Gumbleton served as the pastor to a number of parishes, including St. Aloysius, Holy Ghost and St. Leo's in Detroit, until 2007.

During the 1972 Presidential election Gumbleton endorsed Senator George McGovern due to his opposition to the Vietnam War and economic policies. When asked about McGovern's stance on abortion rights for women, he responded that McGovern "would not aid or support the current efforts to liberalize the abortion laws." 

In December 1980, Gumbleton founded the Michigan Coalition for Human Rights with former Episcopal Bishop Harry McGehee, Jr. and Rabbi Richard Hertz. Gumbleton's Sunday homilies from St Leo's parish were documented by the National Catholic Reporter, where he also wrote a regular column.

On May 6, 1987, Gumbleton was one of eight protestors arrested at the US Department of Energy Nevada Test Site in Mercury, Nevada. The arrestees were protesting the testing of nuclear weapons there. On June 4, 1999, Gumbleton was among 26 protestors arrested for blocking an entrance to the White House in Washington, D.C. They were protesting the NATO bombing campaign in Serbia during the Kosovo War. On March 27, 2003, Gumbleton was arrested along with other protestors for violating a ban on large demonstrations in Lafayette Square in Washington, D.C. The protest was about the US invasion of Iraq on March 19.

Resignation controversy
On January 11, 2006, Gumbleton testified at a hearing at the Ohio General Assembly in Columbus, Ohio, about sexual abuse in the Catholic church. The Assembly was considering a bill to create a legal window for victims of sexual abuse to sue the perpetrators. In his statement, Gumbleton endorsed the bill and called for all states to enact bills like this one. He also revealed that he was sexually abused by a priest as an adolescent while in the seminary. He stated; "I don't want to exaggerate that I was terribly damaged. It was not the kind of sexual abuse that many of the victims experience. They are intimidated, embarrassed, and they just bury it. I understand that ... never told my parents.... I never told anybody.According to an account given by Gumbleton in 2011, the bishops of Ohio opposed the proposed sexual abuse bill and were incensed by his testimony. They immediately complained to the Vatican about him. A few days later, Gumbleton received a letter from Cardinal Giovanni Re in Rome, saying that Gumbleton had violated the solidarity of communio episcoporum (communion of bishops) by testifying for the bill in Ohio without the permission of the local bishop. Re ordered Gumbleton to resign immediately as auxiliary bishop and as pastor of St. Leo's Parish.

On February 6, 2006, Gumbleton submitted his letter of resignation as auxiliary bishop of the Archdiocese of Detroit to Pope Benedict XVI. Gumbleton had been required under church law to submit his resignation when he turned 75 in 2005. At that time, he had petitioned to remain in office.

After resignation 
In 2009, the Marquette Citizens for Peace and Justice invited Gumbleton to speak about peace at St. Mark's Lutheran Church in Marquette, Michigan. However, when Bishop Alexander Sample of the Diocese of Marquette heard about the invitation, he asked Gumbleton not to come. Sample said that Gumbleton had not done the courtesy of asking permission from Sample, and Sample did not agree with Gumbleton's views on the ordination of women and LBGT rights.

Views

Catholic teaching regarding gay rights
Gumbleton has written extensively on Catholic teaching regarding homosexuality. Gumbleton often draws from his personal experience of having a gay brother. During his time as auxiliary bishop of Detroit, Gumbleton wore a mitre at a church service that displayed symbols of the cross, a rainbow and a pink triangle. The pink triangle caused particular complaints by some due to its use to identify gay men in Nazi concentration camps. Gumbleton also came into the public eye before the Vatican's Instruction with regard to the ordination of gay men was released, arguing against a ban in a 2007 issue of America.

Church structure and pacifism 
In 2012, Gumbleton signed the Catholic Scholars' Jubilee Declaration on reform of authority in the Catholic Church. On January 14, 2020, he declared that Catholics should not participate in US wars.

See also
 

 Catholic Church hierarchy
 Catholic Church in the United States
 Historical list of the Catholic bishops of the United States
 List of Catholic bishops of the United States
 Lists of patriarchs, archbishops, and bishops

References

External links
 Roman Catholic Archdiocese of Detroit Official Site
 Bishop Gumbleton's Biography from the Archdiocese of Detroit
 Bishop Gumbleton's article on the ordination of homosexuals
 "Interview with Bishop Thomas J. Gumbleton", Frontline, PBS

Episcopal succession

1930 births
Living people
20th-century American Roman Catholic titular bishops
American Christian pacifists
American human rights activists
21st-century American Roman Catholic titular bishops
American tax resisters
Clergy from Detroit
Pontifical Lateran University alumni
Roman Catholic activists
Sacred Heart Major Seminary alumni
Christian radicals
Roman Catholic Archdiocese of Detroit
Religious leaders from Michigan